The 2021–22 Brown Bears men's basketball team represented Brown University in the 2021–22 NCAA Division I men's basketball season. The Bears, led by ninth-year head coach Mike Martin, played their home games at the Paul Bailey Pizzitola Memorial Sports Center in Providence, Rhode Island, and competed as members of the Ivy League.

Previous season

Due to the COVID-19 pandemic, the Ivy League chose not to conduct a season in 2020–21. Therefore, the most recent season in which Brown fielded a men's basketball team was 2019–20, a year during which they finished 15–12, including an 8–6 record in Ivy League play.

The 2019–20 Bears finished fifth in the Ivy League's regular-season standings, meaning they did not qualify for the Ivy League tournament (which was eventually canceled regardless).

Roster

Sources:

Schedule and results

|-
!colspan=12 style=| Non-conference regular season

|-
!colspan=12 style=| Ivy League regular season

Sources:

Notes

References

Brown Bears men's basketball seasons
Brown Bears
Brown Bears men's basketball
Brown Bears men's basketball